Year 951 (CMLI) was a common year starting on Wednesday (link will display the full calendar) of the Julian calendar.

Events 
 By place 

 Europe 
 King Berengar II of Italy seizes Liguria, with help from the feudal lord Oberto I. He reorganizes the territories south of the Po River, dividing them into three new marches (frontier districts), named after their respective margraves: the Marca Aleramica, the Marca Arduinica, and the Marca Obertenga. The last division consists of Lombardy with the cities of Genoa, Luni, Tortona, Parma, and Piacenza. Berengar forces Adelaide, the widow of Lothair II, to marry his son Adalbert. However, she fiercely refuses and Berengar has her imprisoned at Garda Castle. With the help of Count Adalbert Atto of Canossa Adelaide manages to escape.
 Fall – King Otto I crosses the Brenner Pass and takes his army into Italy. He is accompanied by his brothers, Henry I (duke of Bavaria), Bruno I, and Conrad the Red (duke of Lotharingia). Otto faces no opposition and they arrive in Pavia. Berengar II has departed the day before and entrenched himself in San Marino. Otto receives the homage of the Italian nobility, marries Adelaide, and declares himself King of the Lombards.
 Otto I dispatches an embassy to Rome to apply for an imperial coronation with Pope Agapetus II – but Prince Alberic II makes it clear that this is not possible (afraid of Otto's growing power), and opposes the request.

 China 
 February 9 – The Northern Han Kingdom is founded by Liu Chong (called Shizu) in modern-day Shanxi who restores the diplomatic relations with the Khitans. Northern Han becomes a protectorate of the Liao Dynasty.
 February 13 – Guo Wei, a court official, leads a military coup and declares himself emperor of the new Later Zhou. The 19-year-old Emperor Liu Chengyou is killed after a 3-year reign, ending the short-lived Later Han.
 Emperor Shi Zong successfully repels a Chinese advance from the south. In October he is killed by a rebellious nephew after a three year reign. Shi Zong is succeeded by his uncle Mu Zong as ruler of the Liao Dynasty.
 November 16 – Emperor Li Jing sends a Southern Tang expeditionary force (10,000 men) under Bian Hao to conquer Chu. Li Jing removes the ruling family to his own capital in Nanjing, ending the Chu Kingdom.

Africa 

 Abd ar-Rahman III consolidated his grip on North Africa by occupying Tangier in 951.

 Abd ar-Rahman III signs a peace in 951 with the new king of León, Ordoño III, in order to have a free hand against the Fatimids, whose ships are harassing the caliphal fleet in the Mediterranean and had even launched an assault against Almeria. Abd ar-Rahman's force, led by prime minister Ahmad ibn Said, besieges the Fatimid port of Tunis, which purchases its safety through a huge sum.

Births 
 Abu Talib Yahya, Muslim imam of the Zaydiyyah sect (d. 1033)
 Gaston II Centule, viscount of Béarn (approximate date)
 Gregory of Narek, Armenian monk and theologian (d. 1003)
 Henry II (the Wrangler), duke of Bavaria (d. 995)
 Ibn al-Kattani, Moorish scholar and physician (d. 1029)
 Liu Chenggui, official of the Song Dynasty (d. 1016)
 Romuald, founder of the Camaldolese order (approximate date)
 Sidi Mahrez, Muslim scholar and 'protector' (wali) (d. 1022)
 Zhao Dezhao (Yi of Yan), prince of the Song Dynasty (d. 979)

Deaths 
 January 1 – Ramiro II, king of León and Galicia
 January 2
 Liu Chengyou, emperor of Later Han (b. 931)
 Su Fengji, Chinese official and chancellor
 January 25 – Ma Xiguang, ruler of Chu (Ten Kingdoms)
 February 24 – Liu Yun, Chinese governor (jiedushi)
 March 12 – Ælfheah the Bald, bishop of Winchester
 June 7 – Lu Wenji, Chinese chancellor (b. 876)
 June 8 – Zhao Ying, Chinese chancellor (b. 885)
 October 7 
 Shi Zong, emperor of the Liao Dynasty (b. 919)
 Xiao, Chinese Khitan empress dowager
 Zhen, Chinese Khitan empress consort
 October 8 – Xiao Sagezhi, Chinese Khitan empress
 Cadwgan ab Owain, king of Glywysing (Wales)
 Cennétig mac Lorcáin, king of Tuadmumu (Ireland)
 Gofraid mac Sitriuc, Viking king of Dublin (Ireland)
 Wang Chuhui, Chinese chief of staff (shumishi)
 Wang Yanzheng, emperor of Min (approximate date)

References